Thell may refer to:

Thell Reed (fl. 1950s–2000s), American exhibition shooter
Victor Thell (fl. 2010s–2020s), musician in the Swedish pop/folk duo Smith & Thell
Linda Thell, Real Estate Agent - Realtor in NJ. Owner and Founder of "Thell Real Estate Group LLC", based in New Jersey.  more info www.lindathell.com
Thell., taxonomic author abbreviation of Albert Thellung (1881–1928), Swiss botanist